James Robert Snyder (August 15, 1932 – March 9, 2021) was an American professional baseball player, coach and manager, best known for his 105-game stint as pilot of the 1988 Seattle Mariners, from June 6 through the end of the season.

Snyder attended Eastern Michigan University, earning bachelor's and master's degrees.  His minor league career as a second baseman began in 1953, and after lengthy service with the Triple-A Indianapolis Indians, he was acquired by the Twins in September 1961. As a 29-year-old rookie, Snyder went hitless in five at bats that month, then notched only one safety in ten at bats during an early-season 1962 trial with Minnesota.  He did not return to the Majors until June 1964, when the Twins gave him a 26-game audition.  Altogether, he batted only .140 in 86 MLB at bats, with 12 hits and one home run, hit July 15, 1964, off Don Rudolph of the Washington Senators.

In 1966, he began his managerial career in the farm system of the Cincinnati Reds, where over 11 years he rose from Short Season–Class A to the Triple-A level as skipper of the 1976 Indianapolis Indians. Snyder then spent five seasons as a manager in the Philadelphia Phillies' organization, including two years at Triple-A with the Oklahoma City 89ers. In 1982, he was among several Phillies' instructors and scouts who accompanied Dallas Green to the Chicago Cubs' system, where Snyder was field coordinator of instruction from 1982 to 1986 and a Major League coach in 1987.

During that offseason, Snyder joined the Mariners' 1988 staff as first-base coach for veteran manager Dick Williams.  With the Mariners at 23–33 on June 6, and Williams under fire for lack of communication with his players, Snyder was promoted to acting manager.  Weathering a 1–12 patch from June 8–21, Seattle played marginally better (.429 vs. .411) in its four months under Snyder, but the Mariners finished last in the American League West and at the end of the season, he was replaced by Jim Lefebvre.

Snyder then spent his first term as coordinator of instruction for the Chicago White Sox in 1989–90, returning to the big leagues as a coach for San Diego Padres' manager Greg Riddoch in 1991–92.  After working as a minor-league coach in the Atlanta Braves' system in 1993, Snyder rejoined the White Sox as director of instruction in 1994, serving for a dozen years in that role.

Snyder died on March 9, 2021, in Lutz, Florida.

References

External links

1932 births
2021 deaths
Albany Senators players
Asheville Tourists managers
Atlanta Crackers players
Baseball players from Michigan
Chicago Cubs coaches
Columbus Foxes players
Dallas Rangers players
Des Moines Bruins players
Eastern Michigan Eagles baseball players
Eastern Michigan University alumni
Fordson High School alumni
Indianapolis Indians managers
Indianapolis Indians players
Major League Baseball bench coaches
Major League Baseball first base coaches
Major League Baseball second basemen
Memphis Chickasaws players
Minnesota Twins players
Pine Bluff Judges players
Reading Phillies managers
San Antonio Missions players
San Diego Padres coaches
San Diego Padres (minor league) players
Seattle Mariners coaches
Seattle Mariners managers
Sportspeople from Dearborn, Michigan
Tulsa Oilers (baseball) players
Vancouver Mounties players
Wichita Indians players
York White Roses players